Kamal Prakash Malla (1936 – 17 November 2018) was a professor emeritus of Newar studies at Tribhuvan University, where he was previously university rector.

His research has touched upon many aspects of Newar history and language, including writing a grammar of the Kathmandu dialect, and serving as editor-in-chief of a comprehensive dictionary of Classical Newar.

Works
Malla, Kamal P. 1973. "Language." In Nepal in perspective, edited by S.J.B. Rana Pashupati and eds., K.P. Malla. . Kathmandu, Centre for Economic Development and Administration:101-8.
Malla, Kamal P. 1973. "A Preliminary Note On the Linguistic Archeology of the Nepal Valley." In Studia Turcologica Cracoviensia,
Malla, Kamal P. 1975. "Linguistic Studies in Nepal." In Vasudha 15:17-24. (Also pub. in Sharma and Friedman, eds., Seminar papers in linguistics, Kathmandu, INAS, 1-14(1976).
KP Malla (1979). The road to nowhere. Kathmandu: Sajha Prakashan.
Malla, Kamal P. 1981. "Linguistic Archeology of the Nepal Valley - a Preliminary Report." In Kailash, 5-23.
KP Malla (1982) Classical Newari Literature: A Sketch
Malla, Kamal P. 1984 Impeccable historiography in Nepal: a rebuttal. Nepal Study Centre.
KP Malla (1985) The Newari language: A working outline.
D Vajracarya, KP Malla (1985) The Gopalarãjavãmsavalĩ. Steiner Verlag.
Malla, Kamal P. 1985. "Epigraphy and Society in Ancient Nepal." In Contributions to Nepalese Studies, 13, no. 1.
Malla, Kamal P. 1989. "Language and Society in Nepal." In Nepal: perspective on continuity and change, edited by Kamal P. Malla. 445-466. Centre for Nepal & Asian Studies, Tribhuvan University.
Malla, Kamal P. 1990. "The Earliest Dated Document in Newari: the Palmleaf From Uku Bahah NS 235/AD 1114." In Kailash, 16, no. 1-2.
Malla, Kamal P. 1996. "The Profane Names of the Sacred Hillocks." In Contributions to Nepalese Studies, 23, no. 1.
Malla, Kamal P. 1998. "The Classical Newari Dictionary Project 1986-1996 : Problems and Prospects." In Lexicography in Nepal : proceedings of the Institute on Lexicography, 1995, edited by Yogendra P. Yadava Tej R. Kansakar. Kathmandu, 104-111. Royal Nepal Acad. Kamaladi.
Malla, Kamal P. 1999. "The Profane Names of the Sacred Hillocks." In Topics in Nepalese linguistics, edited by Yogendra P Yadava and Warren W Glover. 444-450. Royal Nepal Academy.
Malla, Kamal P. 2006 (review of) "A History of Nepal by John Whelpton. Cambridge University Press". 'European Bulletin of Himalayan Research.' 26-30: 178-183.

References

Newar studies scholars
1936 births
2018 deaths